The thirty-sixth government of Israel, or the Bennett–Lapid government, was the cabinet of Israel that was formed on 13 June 2021 after the 2021 Israeli legislative election. On 2 June 2021, a coalition agreement was signed between Yesh Atid, Blue and White, Yamina, the Labor Party, Yisrael Beiteinu, New Hope, Meretz, and the United Arab List. The cabinet was succeeded by the thirty-seventh government of Israel, led by Benjamin Netanyahu, on 29 December 2022.

The government had two prime ministers during its existence. Namely, under a rotation agreement, Naftali Bennett of Yamina initially served as Prime Minister but ultimately ceded the position to Yair Lapid of Yesh Atid, after the coalition fell on June 30, 2022. Lapid became Prime Minister on July 1, 2022. Due to the collapse of the government, Lapid served as caretaker Prime Minister until elections were held on November 1, 2022. 

Yamina and Yesh Atid became the fourth and fifth parties, respectively, to lead an Israeli government – following Mapai/Labor Party (1948–1977; 1984–1986; 1992–1996; 1999–2001), Herut/Likud (1977–1984; 1986–1992; 1996–1999; 2001–2005; 2009–2021), and Kadima (2005–2009).

The government was the first to include an independent Arab Israeli party as an official member of the governing coalition. It was Israel's second government, after the Netanyahu-Gantz rotation government, to function under an automatic and legally-binding system of rotation in the position of prime minister. The investiture vote in the Knesset was held on 13 June 2021. The Bennett-Lapid government was confirmed by a vote of 60 to 59, with one MK from the United Arab List abstaining. Bennett was thus sworn in as Israel's 13th prime minister, with Lapid serving as alternate prime minister.

Background 

President Reuven Rivlin met with all elected parties and received their recommendations for prime minister on 5 April 2021, and gave Prime Minister Benjamin Netanyahu the mandate on 6 April. This was the first time in Israel's history where there were recommendations for three candidates (Netanyahu, Yair Lapid, and Naftali Bennett), rather than two, after the legislative election. Netanyahu was given a mandate to form a new government by the end of 4 May, but he failed to form a government by the deadline.

April recommendations

May recommendations

Government formation 
The 2021 election once more produced a hung Knesset, with neither the pro-Netanyahu right-wing bloc (Likud, Shas, United Torah Judaism, and Religious Zionist Party; with 52 seats) nor the ideologically diverse non-Arab anti-Netanyahu opposition (Yesh Atid, Blue and White, Labor Party, Yisrael Beiteinu, New Hope, and Meretz; with 51 seats) winning enough seats to form a new government outright (61 seats are needed for an absolute majority). This left the conservative Yamina and the two Arab political factions, the Joint List and United Arab List, as the potential kingmakers for a Knesset majority.

Yamina leader Naftali Bennett stated that his first preference was the formation of a right-wing government, while his second choice would be the establishment of a broader "national unity government", to avoid a fifth election in just over two years time. Even with the potential addition of Yamina, the pro-Netanyahu bloc would still have been short of an absolute majority by two seats. Namely, Gideon Sa'ar of the right-wing New Hope party had refused to enter into any coalition in which Netanyahu would remain prime minister, thus hindering the formation of a pure right-wing majority government. In addition, while Netanyahu had been open to limited forms of cooperation with the United Arab List to put an end to the deadlock, the Religious Zionist Party ruled out being a part of any right-wing majority which would rely on the UAL's outside support.

Netanyahu's mandate (6 April–4 May 2021) 
On 6 April 2021, Benjamin Netanyahu was given the first mandate to establish a coalition by the president Reuven Rivlin. During his efforts to form a government, he offered both his allies and his rivals several proposals for rotation agreements, which would see the prime ministership change hands between parties mid-term. Namely, in a bid to appease Bennett and Sa'ar – either of whom was foreseen to take part in a potential rotation, he offered the post to fellow Likud member and Knesset speaker Yariv Levin. Thereafter, Netanyahu also unsuccessfully tried to include Aryeh Deri of Shas, and then the incumbent Alternate Prime Minister, Benny Gantz of Blue and White, into similar agreements. Netanyahu's mandate to form a government formally expired at midnight on 4 May 2021.

While Netanyahu held the formal mandate to lead talks on a new government, simultaneous discussions were taking place between the parties of the "change bloc". Namely, Lapid stated his willingness to enter into a rotation government with Naftali Bennett, and even offered him the opportunity to hold the post of prime minister for the first half of the Knesset term. These efforts to establish a broad anti-Netanyahu government, which would span the whole political spectrum, were challenged by questions relating to the distribution of ministerial portfolios between the three main blocs (right, centre, and left), as well as to the possibility of including a mutual veto into any coalition agreement among the parties. Another concern was that such an ideologically diverse, seven-party, coalition would still not hold an absolute parliamentary majority – thus requiring outside support to govern effectively. Parties that were mentioned as hypothetical partners in such a cooperation agreement included the United Arab List and United Torah Judaism (especially its Degel HaTorah faction).

Lapid's mandate (5 May–2 June 2021) 

On 5 May 2021, Yesh Atid leader Yair Lapid was officially tasked with the formation of a government by president Rivlin. He had been recommended for the prime ministership by 56 Knesset members from seven factions – including New Hope and almost all of the Joint List. On the same day, one of Yamina's Knesset members, Amichai Chikli, voiced his open opposition to any agreement on a new government which would include Meretz or the Joint List, thus potentially lowering the bloc's plurality from 58 to 57 seats.

On 7 May 2021, several rounds of talks took place between different parties in the bloc, with Yisrael Beiteinu also issuing a formal list of conditions for its entrance into any potential coalition. They included the adoption of laws regarding the following issues: a two-term limit for the prime minister, compulsory voting in elections, compulsory conscription for male ultra-Orthodox Jews, putting more focus on secular studies in the ultra-Orthodox Jewish community, a penalty of life imprisonment for the rape of a minor, allowing local authorities to decide on the closure of businesses on Saturdays, the introduction of civil law marriage, as well as a new, two-year state budget. The party's chairman, Avigdor Lieberman, also promised to set up two state commissions of inquiry, to investigate the Netanyahu administration's possible culpability in the circumstances which led to a deadly stampede on Mount Meron on 30 April 2021, as well as its overall handling of the COVID-19 pandemic in the country. The proposal to allow civil marriages drew strong opposition from the United Arab List, which views it as a "violation of family values".

On 8 May 2021, media sources reported that the parties had allegedly agreed on several general mechanisms and basic principles, which were to form the basis of their cooperation. The leaders of the parties still disagreed over the distribution of many ministerial positions within the potential government, specifically the portfolios of justice (demanded by both Yamina, for Ayelet Shaked; and New Hope, for Sa'ar), education (sought by Yamina, New Hope, for Yifat Shasha-Biton; and Meretz, for Nitzan Horowitz) and defense (desired by both Blue and White, for Benny Gantz; and New Hope, for Sa'ar). In addition to the justice and education ministries, Yamina had also asked for the portfolios of public security and of religious affairs, all of which are considered to be "ideological" in nature. Despite these disputes, several points of agreement were reached, including on the matter that Naftali Bennett and Yair Lapid would each serve as prime minister for two years. In such an arrangement Lapid would have served as foreign minister under Bennett, while Avigdor Lieberman would have held the position of finance minister. The parties of the potential coalition also discussed a rotation agreement regarding the position of Knesset speaker, which could have been held by Meir Cohen of Yesh Atid and Ze'ev Elkin of New Hope. In exchange for giving its outside support to a "change bloc" and Yamina coalition government, the United Arab List supposedly asked for the chairmanship of an important Knesset committee (either internal or economic affairs), as well as for several measures aimed at improving the living conditions of the Israeli Arabs – a five-year economic plan for the community, a plan on how to decrease violent crimes among Arabs, the annulment of a 2019 law banning illegal construction, and solutions to problems facing the Negev Bedouins.

According to media sources, by 10 May 2021 the discussions between the six-party "change bloc", Yamina and the United Arab List were progressing toward a successful conclusion. Namely, both the "change bloc" and Yamina had agreed to the UAL's demands – including the legal recognition of three Negev Bedouin communities and a budget to tackle violent crime in the Arab community, thereby gaining its crucial backing – which would have taken the form of a confidence and supply arrangement rather than that of a formal coalition deal. Therefore, if such a UAL-backed minority coalition had indeed been formed, it would have become the first government in Israel to have had the active support of an Israeli Arab political party. In addition to having made progress on an agreement with the UAL, the "change bloc" and Yamina had also reached several other mutual conclusions. These included a policy of avoiding major discussions on matters of religion – unless it was shown that there could be potential broad support for a certain decision in that area; a decision to continue Netanyahu's policies regarding the West Bank – that is, to maintain existing Israeli settlements there, and allow further construction within them, but also to not allow any new settlements or to annex any new areas of the West Bank; and a possibility of setting up a state commission of inquiry to investigate the circumstances of the 30 April stampede at a Jewish pilgrimage site on Mount Meron.

The parties were considering introducing legislation which would have limited the prime minister to two full terms in office (which, without a grandfather clause, could have possibly barred Benjamin Netanyahu from ever returning to the position) and which would have also prohibited anyone who is indicted from receiving the mandate to form a government from the president, as well as from becoming either the prime minister or the leader of the opposition in the Knesset. The New Hope party sought the division of the post of attorney general into two separate offices, thereby creating the position of a general prosecutor as well. With regard to the distribution of cabinet seats, the justice portfolio likely would have gone to New Hope's Sa'ar, while Blue and White's Gantz would probably have continued in the role of defense minister. In addition, Meretz's Horowitz and Tamar Zandberg were tapped for health and environmental protection minister, respectively. Shaked, on the other hand, had been given the choice of serving as either interior, public security, education or transportation minister. The interior ministry is also being sought by Labor's Merav Michaeli, while education is being contested by both Meretz (for Horowitz) and New Hope (for Yifat Shasha-Biton). Blue and White and Yisrael Beiteinu were also said to be making claims for certain key portfolios. Had Meretz or the Labor Party not met their demands regarding cabinet positions, they had supposedly been offered the chairmanships of some Knesset committees as a form of compensation. Local sources thus reported that Lapid had intended to inform president Rivlin of his success in building a government by the end of the second week of May, with the swearing-in of Naftali Bennett as Israel's 13th prime minister then due to take place some time after the Shavuot festival (which fell between 16 and 18 May 2021).

Abandonment of negotiations for a "change government" 
On the afternoon of 10 May 2021, the clashes in Jerusalem between Palestinian protesters and Israeli police – which had been ongoing since 6 May, escalated with the firing of over 400 rockets at Israel by both Hamas and the Islamic Jihad Movement in Palestine. This prompted a response by Israel, who initiated airstrikes in the Gaza Strip. Both attacks were lethal and also caused hundreds of injuries. As a result of these incidents, the talks on the formation of a new government were frozen indefinitely, with the United Arab List refusing to continue the then-nearly finalized negotiations with the "change bloc" and Yamina until the security situation is resolved. On 12 May, UAL leader Mansour Abbas once more clearly expressed his commitment to the continuation of talks with the parties of the prospective new governing coalition, once the widespread violence is brought under control.

During the evening of 13 May and the morning of 14 May 2021, Yamina formally abandoned the coalition talks with the "change bloc", with Naftali Bennett stating that he no longer favoured establishing a government which would rely on the support of the United Arab List. In his announcement, Bennett cited the ongoing conflict between Palestinian militant groups and the Israeli military, as well as the riots and looting taking place in Israel, as the reasons for his decision. Namely, Bennett emphasized that he felt that a UAL-backed "change bloc" government would not have the capacity to deal with the security challenges facing the country, nor could it implement the necessary legal consequences which would need to befall those who took part in the unrest. Bennett thus declared that he would once again initiate talks with Likud, and would aim to form a broad "unity government", which could possibly also include Yesh Atid, Blue and White, and New Hope. Bennett has agreed to a proposal which would turn the prime ministership into a directly elected position (as it was from 1996 until 2001), which is something that also has the support of Likud. The United Arab List's Mansour Abbas stated that he would be willing to support the decision as well, provided that several conditions – relating to the improvement of the quality of life of Israeli Arabs, were met. Meanwhile, government ministers from Blue and White rejected the possibility of entering a new government with Netanyahu, as did the representatives of New Hope.

On the morning of 14 May, it was reported that Likud and Yamina had reached a formal agreement on a new government. According to the deal, the latter party will be given eight reserved places among the coalition's top 40 candidates in the next Knesset election, while Bennett and Shaked will also serve as Netanyahu's defense and foreign ministers, respectively. Lapid refused to give up on forming a "change bloc" government, stating that he will keep the presidential mandate until it expires, and also expressed a willingness to face a new election if all other options fail to resolve the deadlock.

Resumption of efforts to form a government 
Bennett again changed his position, and indicated on 23 May that he would be open to serving with Lapid. On 25 May, Meretz agreed to a coalition government, and thus, Lapid announced that he will be handing them the ministries of health, environment, and regional cooperation if the coalition government gets formed, while the ministry of treasury will be handed to Avigdor Lieberman's Yisrael Beiteinu. Lapid and Bennett met on 27 May, in a move that was not made known to any other members of Yamina. On 28 May, Lapid secured the approval of a change government by the Labor Party. Two days later, Bennett announced he was in favor of a unity government, where he would serve as prime minister until September 2023, at which point Lapid would take over.

On the afternoon of 1 June 2021, as talks between the various parties were reported to be coming to a conclusion, Mansour Abbas announced that the United Arab List intends to be a full-fledged member of the "change government" coalition. The party was said to be asking for the position of Deputy Interior Minister, who would most likely serve under Ayelet Shaked of Yamina. Meanwhile, four out of six Knesset members from the Joint List – which had formally stayed outside of both the pro-Netanyahu bloc and the "change bloc", stated that they would not support the new Bennett-Lapid government in a possible confidence vote. These MKs are from the Hadash (which includes the Israeli Communist Party and independent Ayman Odeh) and Balad factions of the coalition. On the other hand, the two MKs from the Ta'al faction remain undecided.

During the evening of 1 June, the negotiations stalled once more. Yamina's Shaked demanded to be named to the Knesset's Judicial Appointments Committee, despite Lapid having already promised the seat to Labour's Michaeli. On the following morning, the negotiations with the United Arab List also encountered new challenges. Specifically, media sources reported that Prime Minister Netanyahu had agreed to repeal a controversial piece of legislation which addresses illegal housing construction – popularly dubbed the "Kaminitz law", and had thereby indirectly encouraged the UAL's MKs to heighten their demands in their talks with the "change bloc". These new demands had the effect of alienating the pro-"change" right-wing parties, Yamina and New Hope, which openly oppose a repeal of the law. Negotiations on the possible "change government" also took place on the sidelines of a Knesset session called to elect the new president of Israel. Isaac Herzog was easily elected as the 11th president of the country, and achieved the support of a broad range of parties. He received 87 votes, to just 26 for his only rival, Miriam Peretz.

On the night of 2 June, just hours before the expiration of Lapid's mandate to form a government, Yamina made a formal offer to Labour, with the aim of resolving the issue surrounding the membership of the Judicial Appointments Committee. Namely, the proposal consisted of a rotation agreement, according to which Shaked would serve on the body as the government's representative during Bennett's tenure as prime minister, while a Labour MK would represent the coalition parties themselves. Then, when Bennett cedes the prime ministership to Lapid in 2023, Shaked would in turn cede her seat to Michaeli, while the Labour party MK would be replaced by an MK from Yamina.

In response to this, Michaeli accepted the concept of a rotation, but insisted that she should serve during Bennett's tenure as prime minister, to ensure an ideological balance between the party blocs. Shaked rejected Michaeli's offer. Ultimately, the original proposal was adopted as a compromise solution. At the same time, Lapid, Bennett, and Abbas held a private meeting, with the aim of reaching a last-ditch consensus agreement. The "change bloc" released details of an agreement that had been reached between the various parties regarding the distribution of ministerial portfolios during Lapid's possible tenure as prime minister. Under the deal, Bennett would serve as interior minister (in addition to being Alternate Prime Minister), Shaked would become justice minister, and Sa'ar would take over as foreign minister. Only three hours before the deadline, the Southern Islamic Movement's shura council authorized the United Arab List to give its conditional support to the Bennett-Lapid government. The backing entailed a promise that negotiations would continue on the issues of the so-called "Kaminitz law" and the legalization of Bedouin villages in the Negev desert. Therefore, less than two hours before Lapid's mandate expired, the UAL formally joined the coalition. A new problem for the potential government arose when one of Yamina's MKs, Nir Orbach, stated that he was considering voting against the government in the Knesset. Such a move would deprive the "change government" of an absolute majority, and would tie it with the opposition at 60 seats each. During the negotiations at the Kfar Maccabiah Hotel, rival protests were being held outside by supporters of the Bennett-Lapid deal and by right-wing activists who oppose the "change government". One of the protesters who opposed the possible new government addressed the others and called for Orbach's house in Petah Tikva to be burned, should he vote in favor of the coalition deal.

Conclusion of negotiations 
On the night of 2 June 2021, and less than an hour before his mandate was due to expire, Lapid informed outgoing president Reuven Rivlin that he can form a new government.

Had Lapid not succeeded in assembling a coalition by 2 June, he could have been given a one-week extension, but only as long as he claimed to have a government ready to be voted on. If this had not been the case, the mandate would have passed back to the president, who would then in turn have passed the mandate onto the Knesset itself, which would then have had 21 days to nominate one of its members for prime minister. If the Knesset could not agree on a new nominee (by an absolute majority of 61 members), the Knesset would have automatically dissolved, and a new election would have been called.

Final coalition agreements
On 11 June 2021, Bennett's Yamina party became the last opposition fraction to sign a coalition agreement with Lapid's Yesh Atid party. This set the stage for a new Israeli government to be sworn in on 13 June. On 12 June 2021, media sources released the content of the final coalition agreements signed between the "change bloc" parties in the preceding days.

The basic guidelines of the new government's policy would be the following: a bill to set term limits for the prime minister and allow only one re-election (though the details of the bill are not yet laid out), the setting up of a commission of inquiry to investigate the April 2021 Mount Meron disaster, the abolition of four existing government ministries – Cyber and National Digital Matters, National Infrastructures, Energy and Water Resources, Community Empowerment and Advancement, and Strategic Affairs; the increasing of the old-age income supplement to 70% of the minimum wage, the adoption of a reform package to benefit disabled war veterans, the creation of more competition among the providers of kashrut services and the introduction of consistent standards in that area, as well as the changing of the body which selects the chief rabbi (so as to allow for the election of a Zionist to the position), and the opening up of the possibility for gentiles to convert to Judaism by applying with municipal rabbinical authorities. The agreement includes creating binding regulations for reduce GHG emissions.

Members of government

Ministers
The following are the ministers of the 36th Israeli government in its final makeup.

Deputy ministers

Investiture vote 
The outgoing speaker of the Knesset, Yariv Levin, a member of prime minister Netanyahu's Likud party, had indicated that he would attempt to delay the holding of an investiture vote for the proposed Bennett-Lapid government for as long as legally possible. Thus, on 3 June 2021, some of the parties of the "change bloc" initiated a motion of no-confidence in Levin, with the aim of replacing him with Mickey Levy of Yesh Atid and bringing the investiture vote forward. Immediately thereafter, Yamina MK Nir Orbach indicated that he would oppose the move, and it was then instead unilaterally endorsed by all six MKs from the Joint List. Yesh Atid and Yamina rejected the Joint List's offer of support, and Yamina even indicated that it would only support the election of a new speaker when the new government itself had already been sworn in. On 13 June 2021, the incoming government nominated Levy for the post of speaker, while Shas in turn nominated its MK Yaakov Margi. Levy defeated Margi by a margin of 67–52 and immediately took over the presiding of the Knesset session from Levin.

The investiture vote for the government was also held on 13 June 2021. While the eight parties of the so-called "change bloc" coalition formally had an absolute majority consisting of 62 Knesset members, one Yamina MK, Amichai Chikli, had already ruled out supporting the incoming government. As of the proposed government's announcement on 2 June 2021, the only opposition MKs who had not yet declared how they would vote were the two members of the Arab Israeli Ta'al faction within the Joint List. On 13 June 2021, Ta'al's MKs indicated that they would be ready to abstain during the investiture vote if the proposed government lost its own majority through defections. This would likely have allowed the Bennett-Lapid government to be confirmed to office by a plurality of MKs. Ultimately, the new government was successfully voted in by a margin of 60 to 59, with the only abstention being that of United Arab List MK Said al-Harumi.

Dissolution

On 20 June 2022, following several legislative defeats for the governing coalition in the Knesset, Bennett and Lapid jointly announced the introduction of a bill to dissolve the Knesset, stating that Lapid would become the interim prime minister following the dissolution. The bill to dissolve the Knesset passed its first reading on 28 June. 

The bill passed its third reading on 29 June and the date for elections was set for 1 November 2022. Bennett opted to retire from politics and not seek reelection; he resigned as the leader of Yamina on 29 June, and was succeeded by Ayelet Shaked.

On 30 June, in accordance with the coalition agreement, Lapid succeeded Bennett as the caretaker Prime Minister until a new government is formed. Bennett turned down the position of acting Foreign Minister, although he formally remained alternate Prime Minister. Lapid thus continued to hold the position of Foreign Minister.

See also 
 2019–2021 Israeli political crisis
 List of members of the twenty-fourth Knesset

Notes

References

External links 

 
 Thirty-sixth government of Israel. Knesset.

2021 establishments in Israel
2021 in Israeli politics
Israel
 36
Naftali Bennett
Rotation governments
Israel